Abu ’l-ʿAbbās (or Abū Dj̲aʿfar) Aḥmad ibn ʿAbd Allāh ibn Hurayra al-ʿUtbī (or al-Kaysī) (died 1126), nicknamed al-Aʿmā al-Tuṭīlī or the Blind Poet of Tudela, was an Andalusian Arab poet who composed in Arabic. Although born in Tudela, he was raised in Seville, where he gained talent in poetry. He later lived in Murcia. He died young. He was one of the best-known strophic poets and songwriters (muwas̲h̲s̲h̲aḥ and zajal) of the Almoravid period in Al-Andalus (1091–1145) and competed with Ibn Bajjah in witty compositions at the court of Ibn Tifilwit, the Almoravid governor in Saragossa. He wrote panegyrics to both the Almoravids in al-Andalus and the Banu Kasim in Alpuente (Al-Sahla) and was famous for his love poems. Especially well known is the elegy he wrote  on the death of his wife, whom he invokes by the name of Amina.

Notes

Bibliography
Al-A'ma at-Tutili, Diwan, ed. Ihsan Abbas (Beirut, 1963)
E. Garzia Gomez, las jarchas romances de la serie árabe en su marco (Madrid 1965)
Nykl p. 254-6
al-Acma al-Tutili, [El ciego de Tudela]: Las moaxajas. Traducción y prólogo: M. Nuin Monreal, W. S. Alkhalifa, 2001

12th-century writers from al-Andalus
Poets from al-Andalus
Poets under the Almoravid dynasty
1126 deaths
12th-century Arabic poets
Year of birth unknown
Muslim panegyrists